Cantiga da Ribeirinha (also known as Cantiga da Garvaia or Cantiga da Guarvaia) is one of the first known pieces of literature in Galician-Portuguese. The poem's date of composition is debated, with some experts placing it in 1189 or 1198, and others claiming it could not have been written before 1200. It was composed by Paio Soares de Taveirós and received its name because it was dedicated to Maria Pais Ribeira, the mistress of Sancho I of Portugal, known as "Ribeirinha."

Using the male I-lyric, the text tells of a platonic love between a poet of low station and a noble and unattainable woman. Although considered a love tune, it is sometimes interpreted instead as a song of derision or slander. Some experts believe that the poem is incomplete, and originally comprised three stanzas, with one having been lost. A recent hypothesis contests the poem's authorship, attributing it instead to Martim Soares de Baguim.

Lyrics

No mundo non me sei parelha,
mentre me for' como me vai,
ca ja moiro por vós - e ai!
mia senhor branca e vermelha,
Queredes que vos retraia
quando vos eu vi em saia!
Mao dia me levantei,
que vos enton non vi fea!

E, mia senhor, des aquelha
me foi a mi mui mal di'ai!
E vós, filha de don Paai
Moniz, e ben vos semelha
d'haver eu por vós guarvaia,
pois eu, mia senhor, d'alfaia
nunca de vós ouve nen hei
valía dũa correa.

Modern Portuguese and English

External links
Wikisource: No mundo non me sei parelha

References
Nicola, J. Literatura portuguesa da Idade Média a Fernando Pessoa. São Paulo: Scipione, 1992. ed. 2. p. 28. 
https://www.portaleducacao.com.br/conteudo/artigos/educacao/cantiga-de-ribeirinha-literatura-portuguesa/32033

Galician-Portuguese
12th-century poems